Poșta Câlnău is a commune in Buzău County, Muntenia, Romania. It is composed of six villages: Aliceni, Coconari, Poșta Câlnău, Potârnichești, Sudiți and Zilișteanca.

Notes

Communes in Buzău County
Localities in Muntenia